Cochise County is a county in the southeastern corner of the U.S. state of Arizona. It is named after the Native American chief Cochise.

The population was 125,447 at the 2020 census. The county seat is Bisbee and the most populous city is Sierra Vista.

Cochise County includes the Sierra Vista-Douglas, Arizona Metropolitan Statistical Area. The county borders southwestern New Mexico and the northwestern Mexican state of Sonora.

History

In 1528, Spanish explorers Álvar Núñez Cabeza de Vaca, Estevanico, and Fray Marcos de Niza survived a shipwreck off the Texas coast. Captured by Native Americans, they spent eight years finding their way back to Mexico City, via the San Pedro Valley. Their journals, maps, and stories led to the Cibola, seven cities of gold myth. The Expedition of Francisco Vásquez de Coronado in 1539 using it as his route north through what they called the Guachuca Mountains of Pima (Tohono O'odham) lands and later part of the mission routes north, but was actually occupied by the Sobaipuri descendants of the Hohokam. They found a large Pueblo (described as a small city) between present-day Benson and Whetstone, and several smaller satellite villages and smaller pueblos including ones on Fort Huachuca, Huachuca City and North Eastern Fry. About 1657 Father Kino visited the Sobaipuris just before the Apache forced most from the valley, as they were struggling to survive due to increasing Chiricahua Apache attacks as they moved into the area of Texas Canyon of the Dragoon Mountains. In 1775, Presidio Santa Cruz de Terrenate was founded on the west bank of the San Pedro River to protect the natives as well as the Spanish settlers who supplied the mission stations. The presidio was chronically short on provisions due to raids, however, and lacked personnel to adequately patrol the eastern route due to wars with France and England, so the main route north shifted west to the Santa Cruz valley, farther from the range of the Chiricahua Apache who almost exclusively controlled the area by 1821.

Cochise County was created on February 1, 1881, out of the eastern portion of Pima County. It took its name from the legendary Chiricahua Apache war chief Cochise.  The county seat was Tombstone until 1929 when it moved to Bisbee. Notable men who once held the position of County Sheriff were Johnny Behan, who served as the first sheriff of the new county, and who was one of the main characters during the events leading to and following the gunfight at the O.K. Corral. Later, in 1886, Texas John Slaughter became sheriff. Lawman Jeff Milton and lawman/outlaw Burt Alvord both served as deputies under Slaughter.

A syndicated television series which aired from 1956 to 1958, The Sheriff of Cochise starring John Bromfield, was filmed on location in Cochise County. The Jimmy Stewart movie Broken Arrow and subsequent television show of the same name starring John Lupton, which also aired from 1956 to 1958, were set in Cochise County but filmed at other locations.

J.A. Jance's Joanna Brady mystery series takes place in Cochise County, where Brady is sheriff.

Beginning in the late 1950s, the small community of Miracle Valley was the site of a series of bible colleges and similar religious organizations, founded by television evangelist A. A. Allen. In 1982, Miracle Valley and neighboring Palominas were the site of a series of escalating conflicts between a newly arrived black religious community and the county sheriff and deputies that culminated in the Miracle Valley shootout.

Geography
Cochise County is close to the size of the states of Rhode Island and Connecticut combined.

Adjacent counties and municipios

 Santa Cruz County – south and west
 Pima County – west
 Graham County – north
 Greenlee County – north
 Hidalgo County, New Mexico – east
 Agua Prieta, Sonora, Mexico – south
 Cananea, Sonora, Mexico – south
 Naco, Sonora, Mexico – south
 Santa Cruz, Sonora, Mexico – south

Protected areas

 Chiricahua National Monument
 Coronado National Forest (part)
 Coronado National Memorial
 Fort Bowie National Historic Site
 Kartchner Caverns State Park
 Leslie Canyon National Wildlife Refuge
 San Pedro Riparian National Conservation Area

Demographics

2000 census
As of the census of 2000, there were 117,755 people, 43,893 households, and 30,768 families residing in the county.  The population density was 19 people per square mile (7/km2).  There were 51,126 housing units at an average density of 8 per square mile (3/km2).  The racial makeup of the county was 76.7% White, 4.5% Black or African American, 1.2% Native American, 1.7% Asian, 0.3% Pacific Islander, 12.1% from other races, and 3.7% from two or more races.  30.7% of the population were Hispanic or Latino of any race. 25.4% reported speaking Spanish at home, while 1.3% speak German .

There were 43,893 households, out of which 32.0% had children under the age of 18 living with them, 55.1% were married couples living together, 11.1% had a female householder with no husband present, and 29.9% were non-families. 25.3% of all households were made up of individuals, and 10.1% had someone living alone who was 65 years of age or older.  The average household size was 2.55 and the average family size was 3.07.

In the county, the population was spread out, with 26.3% under the age of 18, 9.3% from 18 to 24, 26.0% from 25 to 44, 23.7% from 45 to 64, and 14.7% who were 65 years of age or older.  The median age was 37 years. For every 100 females there were 101.60 males.  For every 100 females age 18 and over, there were 101.20 males.

The median income for a household in the county was $32,105, and the median income for a family was $38,005. Males had a median income of $30,533 versus $22,252 for females. The per capita income for the county was $15,988.  About 13.5% of families and 17.7% of the population were below the poverty line, including 25.8% of those under age 18 and 10.4% of those age 65 or over.

In 2000, the largest denominational group was the Catholics (with 25,837 adherents) and Evangelical Protestants (with 12,548 adherents). The largest religious bodies were The Catholic Church (with 25,837 members) and The Southern Baptist Convention (with 5,999 members).

2010 census
As of the census of 2010, there were 131,346 people, 50,865 households, and 33,653 families residing in the county. The racial makeup of the county was 78.5% white, 4.2% black or African American, 1.9% Asian, 1.2% American Indian, 0.3% Pacific islander, 9.9% from other races, and 4.0% from two or more races. Those of Hispanic or Latino origin made up 32.4% of the population. The largest ancestry groups were:

 28.3% Mexican
 16.2% German
 11.6% Irish
 9.8% English
 4.5% American
 3.7% Italian
 2.6% French
 2.1% Scottish
 2.0% Dutch
 1.9% Scotch-Irish
 1.9% Polish
 1.5% Norwegian
 1.1% Puerto Rican
 1.1% Swedish

Of the 50,865 households, 30.4% had children under the age of 18 living with them, 50.0% were married couples living together, 11.5% had a female householder with no husband present, 33.8% were non-families, and 28.2% of all households were made up of individuals. The average household size was 2.46 and the average family size was 3.02. The median age was 39.7 years.

The median income for a household in the county was $44,876 and the median income for a family was $53,077. Males had a median income of $42,164 versus $31,019 for females. The per capita income for the county was $23,010. About 11.8% of families and 15.7% of the population were below the poverty line, including 23.2% of those under age 18 and 10.7% of those age 65 or over.

Politics
Cochise County leans strongly towards the Republican Party in presidential elections. Although Bill Clinton carried the county narrowly in 1992, it has supported the Republican nominee by large margins in every other election since 1968, except for 1996 and 1976 when Clinton and Jimmy Carter each lost only narrowly. Although the county includes the relatively liberal town of Bisbee, as well as the city of Douglas which has a large Latino population, this is outweighed by the heavily Republican tilt of the more populous Sierra Vista, which is adjacent to Fort Huachuca and thus has a heavy military presence.

 

In the United States House of Representatives, the county is part of Arizona's 2nd congressional district, which is represented by Democrat Ann Kirkpatrick; the majority of the district's population is in Tucson and its suburbs, which are far more liberal than Cochise County. In the Arizona Legislature, the county is part of the 14th district and is represented by Republican David Gowan in the State Senate and Republicans Gail Griffin and Becky Nutt in the State House of Representatives. This district also includes the entirety of Graham County and Greenlee County, as well as portions of Pima County.

Transportation

Major highways

  Interstate 10
  Historic U.S. Route 80
  U.S. Route 191
  State Route 80
  State Route 82
  State Route 83
  State Route 90
  State Route 92
  State Route 186

Airports
Bisbee Municipal Airport is owned by the City of Bisbee and located five nautical miles (9 km) southeast of its central business district

Sierra Vista Municipal Airport (IATA: FHU, ICAO: KFHU, FAA LID: FHU), a joint-use civil-military airport which shares facilities with Libby Army Airfield, is located on the U.S. Army installation Fort Huachuca in the city of Sierra Vista. The airport has three runways and one helipad. It is mostly used for military aviation for the surrounding military base.

There are no commercial flights out of Cochise County; the nearest commercial airport is at Tucson, approximately 70 miles from Sierra Vista.

Communities

Cities
 Benson
 Bisbee (county seat)
 Douglas
 Sierra Vista
 Tombstone
 Willcox

Towns
 Huachuca City

Census-designated places

 Bowie
 Dragoon
 Elfrida
 McNeal
 Mescal
 Miracle Valley
 Naco
 Palominas
 Pirtleville
 Sierra Vista Southeast
 St. David
 San Simon
 Sunizona
 Sunsites
 Whetstone

Other places

 Amber
 Babocomari
 Charleston
 Cochise
 Cross Rail Ranch
 Dos Cabezas
 Double Adobe
 El Dorado
 Hereford
 Hookers Hot Springs
 Kansas Settlement
 Leslie Canyon National Wildlife refuge
 Nicksville
 Paul Spur
 Pomerene
 Portal
 Paradise
 Rucker
 Stewart District
 Sunnyside
 Sunsites
 Tintown

Military sites
 Fort Huachuca
 Willcox Playa (proving ground)

Ghost towns

 Black Diamond
 Cascabel
 Charleston
 Cochise
 Contention City
 Courtland
 Fairbank
 Galeyville
 Gleeson
 Hilltop
 Johnson
 Millville
 Paradise
 Pearce
 Tres Alamos

County population ranking
The population ranking of the following table is based on the 2010 census of Cochise County.

† county seat

Education
School districts include:

Unified:

 Benson Unified School District
 Bisbee Unified District (Bisbee High School)
 Bowie Unified District
 Douglas Unified District
 Fort Huachuca Accommodation District
 San Simon Unified District
 St. David Unified District
 Sierra Vista Unified District
 Tombstone Unified District
 Willcox Unified District

Secondary:
 Valley Union High School District

Elementary:

 Apache Elementary District
 Ash Creek Elementary District
 Cochise Elementary District
 Double Adobe Elementary District
 Elfrida Elementary District
 McNeal Elementary District
 Naco Elementary District
 Palominas Elementary District
 Pearce Elementary District
 Pomerene Elementary District
 Rucker Elementary District

The Rucker Elementary School district, in 2002, operated no schools and sent its elementary students to the Elfrida district. The Rucker district had a bus driver and an administrator as employees. The residents liked the arrangement as they could pay less tax.

See also

 National Register of Historic Places listings in Cochise County, Arizona
 San Pedro Valley Observatory

References

External links
 County website
 Official Tourism Council Site

 
1881 establishments in Arizona Territory
Populated places established in 1881
Arizona placenames of Native American origin
Cochise County conflict